Monensin is a polyether antibiotic isolated from Streptomyces cinnamonensis.  It is widely used in ruminant animal feeds.

The structure of monensin was first described by Agtarap et al. in 1967, and was the first polyether antibiotic to have its structure elucidated in this way. The first total synthesis of monensin was reported in 1979 by Kishi et al.

Mechanism of action

Monensin A is an ionophore related to the crown ethers with a preference to form complexes with monovalent cations such as: Li+, Na+, K+, Rb+, Ag+, and Tl+. Monensin A is able to transport these cations across lipid membranes of cells in an electroneutral (i.e. non-depolarizing) exchange, playing an important role as an Na+/H+ antiporter. Recent studies have shown that monensin may transport sodium ion through the membrane in both electrogenic and electroneutral manner. This approach explains ionophoric ability and in consequence antibacterial properties of not only parental monensin, but also its derivatives that do not possess carboxylic groups. It blocks intracellular protein transport, and exhibits antibiotic, antimalarial, and other biological activities. The antibacterial properties of monensin and its derivatives are a result of their ability to transport metal cations through cellular and subcellular membranes.

Uses
Monensin is used extensively in the beef and dairy industries to prevent coccidiosis, increase the production of propionic acid and prevent bloat. Furthermore, monensin, but also its derivatives monensin methyl ester (MME), and particularly monensin decyl ester (MDE) are widely used in ion-selective electrodes.In laboratory research, monensin is used extensively to block Golgi transport.

Toxicity
Monensin has some degree of activity on mammalian cells and thus toxicity is common. This is especially pronounced in horses, where monensin has a median lethal dose 1/100th that of ruminants. Accidental poisoning of equines with monensin is a well-documented occurrence which has resulted in deaths.

References

Polyketide antibiotics
Ionophores
Carboxylic acids
Spiro compounds
Tetrahydrofurans